The Salem Fair is an agricultural fair in Salem, Virginia, in the United States. It is the largest free fair in the state of Virginia. The fair takes place annually from late June through early July. Attractions include live music and various performances, Fourth of July fireworks, commercial exhibits, and a petting zoo.

The COVID-19 pandemic caused officials to scrap 2020's fair.

References

External links
Official website

Fairs in the United States
Events in Virginia
Tourist attractions in Salem, Virginia
Virginia culture